Diospolis ('City of Zeus') may refer to:

Asia
 Diospolis (Bithynia), in Bithynia, Anatolia
 Diospolis (Lydia), in Lydia, Anatolia
 Diospolis (Pontus), in Pontus, Anatolia
 Diospolis, later Byzantine Lydda, now Lod in modern Israel
 Synod of Diospolis in above Lydda
 The first known name of Laodicea on the Lycus in Phrygia, Anatolia

Egypt
 Diospolis Magna (Great Zeus-City), the Greco-Roman name of Pharaonic Thebes
 Diospolis Parva (Little Zeus-City) or Diospolis Superior, the Greco-Roman names of Pharaonic Hiw
 Dispolis Inferior (Lower Zeus-City), the Greco-Roman name of Pharaonic Paiuenamun

Europe
 Diospolis in Thracia, a city and bishopric in Thrace, now in Bulgaria